Per Erik Rutger Martin-Löf (born 8 May 1942) is a Swedish logician, philosopher, and mathematical statistician. He is internationally renowned for his work on the foundations of probability, statistics, mathematical logic, and computer science.  Since the late 1970s, Martin-Löf's publications have been mainly in logic. In philosophical logic, Martin-Löf has wrestled with the philosophy of logical consequence and judgment, partly inspired by the work of Brentano, Frege, and Husserl. In mathematical logic, Martin-Löf has been active in developing intuitionistic type theory as a constructive foundation of mathematics; Martin-Löf's work on type theory has influenced computer science.

Until his retirement in 2009, Per Martin-Löf held a joint chair for Mathematics and Philosophy at Stockholm University.

His brother Anders Martin-Löf is now emeritus professor of mathematical statistics at Stockholm University; the two brothers have collaborated in research in probability and statistics. The research of Anders and Per Martin-Löf has influenced statistical theory, especially concerning exponential families, the expectation-maximization method for missing data, and model selection.

Per Martin-Löf received his PhD in 1970 from Stockholm University, under Andrey Kolmogorov.

Martin-Löf is an enthusiastic bird-watcher; his first scientific publication was on the mortality rates of ringed birds.

Randomness and Kolmogorov complexity

In 1964 and 1965, Martin-Löf studied in Moscow under the supervision of Andrei N. Kolmogorov. He wrote a 1966 article The definition of random sequences that gave the first suitable definition of a random sequence.

Earlier researchers such as Richard von Mises had attempted to formalize the notion of a test for randomness in order to define a random sequence as one that passed all tests for randomness; however, the precise notion of a randomness test was left vague. Martin-Löf's key insight was to use the theory of computation to define formally the notion of a test for randomness. This contrasts with the idea of randomness in probability; in that theory, no particular element of a sample space can be said to be random.

Martin-Löf randomness has since been shown to admit many equivalent characterizations — in terms of compression, randomness tests, and gambling — that bear little outward resemblance to the original definition, but each of which satisfies our intuitive notion of properties that random sequences ought to have: random sequences should be incompressible, they should pass statistical tests for randomness, and it should be impossible to make money betting on them. The existence of these multiple definitions of Martin-Löf randomness, and the stability of these definitions under different models of computation, give evidence that Martin-Löf randomness is a fundamental property of mathematics and not an accident of Martin-Löf's particular model. The thesis that the definition of Martin-Löf randomness "correctly" captures the intuitive notion of randomness has been called the "Martin-Löf–Chaitin Thesis"; it is somewhat similar to the Church–Turing thesis.

Following Martin-Löf's work, algorithmic information theory defines a random string as one that cannot be produced from any computer program that is shorter than the string (Chaitin–Kolmogorov randomness); i.e. a string whose Kolmogorov complexity is at least the length of the string. This is a different meaning from the usage of the term in statistics. Whereas statistical randomness refers to the process that produces the string (e.g. flipping a coin to produce each bit will randomly produce a string), algorithmic randomness refers to the string itself. Algorithmic information theory separates random from nonrandom strings in a way that is relatively invariant to the model of computation being used.

An algorithmically random sequence is an infinite sequence of characters, all of whose prefixes (except possibly a finite number of exceptions) are strings that are "close to" algorithmically random (their length is within a constant of their Kolmogorov complexity).

Mathematical statistics 

Per Martin-Löf has done important research in mathematical statistics, which (in the Swedish tradition) includes probability theory and statistics.

Bird-watching and sex determination 

Per Martin-Löf began bird watching in his youth and remains an enthusiastic bird-watcher.  As a teenager, he published an article on estimating the mortality rates of birds, using data from bird ringing, in a Swedish zoological journal: This paper was soon cited in leading international journals, and this paper continues to be cited.

In the biology and statistics of birds, there are several problems of missing data. Martin-Löf's first paper discussed the problem of estimating the mortality rates of the Dunlin species, using capture-recapture methods. The problem of determining the biological sex of a bird, which is extremely difficult for humans, is one of the first examples in Martin-Löf's lectures on statistical models.

Probability on algebraic structures 

Martin-Löf wrote a licenciate thesis on probability on algebraic structures, particularly semigroups, while a student of Ulf Grenander at Stockholm University.

Statistical models 

Martin-Löf developed innovative approaches to statistical theory. In his paper "On Tables of Random Numbers", Kolmogorov observed that the frequency probability notion of the limiting properties of infinite sequences failed to provide a foundation for statistics, which considers only finite samples. Much of Martin-Löf's work in statistics was to provide a finite-sample foundation for statistics.

Model selection and hypothesis testing 

In the 1970s, Per Martin-Löf made important contributions to statistical theory and inspired further research, especially by Scandinavian statisticians including Rolf Sundberg, Thomas Höglund, and Steffan Lauritzen. In this work, Martin-Löf's previous research on probability measures on semigroups led to a notion of "repetitive structure" and a novel treatment of sufficient statistics, in which one-parameter exponential families were characterized. He provided a category-theoretic approach to nested statistical models, using finite-sample principles. Before (and after) Martin-Löf, such nested models have often been tested using chi-square hypothesis tests, whose justifications are only asymptotic (and so irrelevant to real problems, which always have finite samples).

Expectation maximization method for exponential families 

Martin-Löf's student, Rolf Sundberg, developed a detailed analysis of the expectation-maximization (EM) method for estimation using data from exponential families, especially with missing data. Sundberg credits a formula, later known as the Sundberg formula, to previous manuscripts of the Martin-Löf brothers, Per and Anders. Many of these results reached the international scientific community through the 1976 paper on the expectation maximization (EM) method by Arthur P. Dempster, Nan Laird, and Donald Rubin, which was published in a leading international journal, sponsored by the Royal Statistical Society.

Logic

Philosophical logic

In philosophical logic, Per Martin-Löf has published papers on the theory of logical consequence, on judgments, etc. He has been interested in Central-European philosophical traditions, especially of the German-language writings of Franz Brentano, Gottlob Frege, and of Edmund Husserl.

Type theory

Martin-Löf has worked in mathematical logic for many decades.

From 1968 to '69 he worked as an assistant professor at the University of Chicago where he met William Alvin Howard with whom he discussed issues related to the Curry–Howard correspondence. Martin-Löf's first draft article on type theory dates back to 1971.  This impredicative theory generalized Girard's System F. However, this system turned out to be inconsistent due to Girard's paradox which was discovered by Girard when studying System U, an inconsistent extension of System F. This experience led Per Martin-Löf to develop the philosophical foundations of type theory, his meaning explanation, a form of proof-theoretic semantics, which justifies predicative type theory as presented in his 1984 Bibliopolis book, and extended in a number of increasingly philosophical texts, such as his influential On the Meanings of the Logical Constants and the Justifications of the Logical Laws.

The 1984 type theory was extensional while the type theory presented in the book by Nordström et al. in 1990, which was heavily influenced by his later ideas, intensional, and more amenable to being implemented on a computer.

Martin-Löf's intuitionistic type theory developed the notion of dependent types and directly influenced the development of the calculus of constructions and the logical framework LF. A number of popular computer-based proof systems are based on type theory, for example NuPRL, LEGO, Coq, ALF, Agda, Twelf, Epigram, and Idris.

Awards
Martin-Löf is a member of the Royal Swedish Academy of Sciences and of the Academia Europaea.

See also

 Franz Brentano
 Rudolf Carnap
 Michael Dummett
 Gottlob Frege
 Ulf Grenander
 Jaakko Hintikka
 Edmund Husserl
 Andrei N. Kolmogorov
 Anders Martin-Löf
 John von Neumann
 Peter Pagin
 Dag Prawitz
 Charles Sanders Peirce
 Frank P. Ramsey
 Bertrand Russell
 Dana Scott
 Alfred Tarski
 Alan Turing

Notes

References

Bird watching and missing data

 George A. Barnard, "Gone Birdwatching", New Scientist, 4 December 1999, magazine issue 2215.

Probability foundations
 Per Martin-Löf.  "The Definition of Random Sequences."  Information and Control, 9(6): 602–619, 1966.
 Li, Ming and Vitányi, Paul, An Introduction to Kolmogorov Complexity and Its Applications, Springer, 1997. Introduction chapter full-text.

Probability on algebraic structures, following Ulf Grenander 
 Grenander, Ulf. Probability on Algebraic Structures. (Dover reprint)
 Martin-Löf, P. The continuity theorem on a locally compact group. Teor. Verojatnost. i Primenen. 10 1965 367–371.
 Martin-Löf, Per. Probability theory on discrete semigroups. Z. Wahrscheinlichkeitstheorie und Verw. Gebiete 4 1965 78—102
 Nitis Mukhopadhyay. "A Conversation with Ulf Grenander". Statist. Sci. Volume 21, Number 3 (2006), 404–426.

Statistics foundations 
 Anders Martin-Löf. 1963. "Utvärdering av livslängder i subnanosekundsområdet" ("Evaluation of lifetimes in time-lengths below one nanosecond"). ("Sundberg formula", according to Sundberg 1971)
 Per Martin-Löf. 1966. Statistics from the point of view of statistical mechanics. Lecture notes, Mathematical Institute, Aarhus University. ("Sundberg formula" credited to Anders Martin-Löf, according to Sundberg 1971)
 Per Martin-Löf. 1970. Statistika Modeller (Statistical Models): Anteckningar fran seminarier läsåret 1969–1970 (Notes from seminars in the academic year 1969–1970), with the assistance of Rolf Sundberg. Stockholm University.
 Martin-Löf, P. "Exact tests, confidence regions and estimates", with a discussion by A. W. F. Edwards, G. A. Barnard, D. A. Sprott, O. Barndorff-Nielsen, D. Basu and G. Rasch. Proceedings of Conference on Foundational Questions in Statistical Inference (Aarhus, 1973), pp. 121–138. Memoirs, No. 1, Dept. Theoret. Statist., Inst. Math., Univ. Aarhus, Aarhus, 1974.
 Martin-Löf, P. Repetitive structures and the relation between canonical and microcanonical distributions in statistics and statistical mechanics. With a discussion by D. R. Cox and G. Rasch and a reply by the author. Proceedings of Conference on Foundational Questions in Statistical Inference (Aarhus, 1973), pp. 271–294. Memoirs, No. 1, Dept. Theoret. Statist., Inst. Math., Univ. Aarhus, Aarhus, 1974.
 Martin-Löf, P. The notion of redundancy and its use as a quantitative measure of the deviation between a statistical hypothesis and a set of observational data. With a discussion by F. Abildgård, A. P. Dempster, D. Basu, D. R. Cox, A. W. F. Edwards, D. A. Sprott, G. A. Barnard, O. Barndorff-Nielsen, J. D. Kalbfleisch and G. Rasch and a reply by the author. Proceedings of Conference on Foundational Questions in Statistical Inference (Aarhus, 1973), pp. 1–42. Memoirs, No. 1, Dept. Theoret. Statist., Inst. Math., Univ. Aarhus, Aarhus, 1974.
 Martin-Löf, Per The notion of redundancy and its use as a quantitative measure of the discrepancy between a statistical hypothesis and a set of observational data. Scand. J. Statist. 1 (1974), no. 1, 3—18.
 Sverdrup, Erling. "Tests without power." Scand. J. Statist. 2 (1975), no. 3, 158–160.
 Martin-Löf, Per Reply to Erling Sverdrup's polemical article: ``Tests without power (Scand. J. Statist. 2 (1975), no. 3, 158–160). Scand. J. Statist. 2 (1975), no. 3, 161–165.
  Sverdrup, Erling. A rejoinder to: ``Tests without power (Scand. J. Statist. 2 (1975), 161—165) by P. Martin-Löf. Scand. J. Statist. 4 (1977), no. 3, 136—138.
 Martin-Löf, P. Exact tests, confidence regions and estimates. Foundations of probability and statistics. II. Synthese 36 (1977), no. 2, 195—206.
 Rolf Sundberg. 1971. Maximum likelihood theory and applications for distributions generated when observing a function of an exponential family variable. Dissertation, Institute for Mathematical Statistics, Stockholm University.
 Sundberg, Rolf. Maximum likelihood theory for incomplete data from an exponential family. Scand. J. Statist. 1 (1974), no. 2, 49—58.
 Sundberg, Rolf An iterative method for solution of the likelihood equations for incomplete data from exponential families. Comm. Statist.—Simulation Comput. B5 (1976), no. 1, 55—64.
 Sundberg, Rolf Some results about decomposable (or Markov-type) models for multidimensional contingency tables: distribution of marginals and partitioning of tests. Scand. J. Statist. 2 (1975), no. 2, 71—79.
 Höglund, Thomas. The exact estimate — a method of statistical estimation. Z. Wahrscheinlichkeitstheorie und Verw. Gebiete 29 (1974), 257—271.
 Lauritzen, Steffen L. Extremal families and systems of sufficient statistics. Lecture Notes in Statistics, 49. Springer-Verlag, New York, 1988. xvi+268 pp.

Foundations of mathematics, logic, and computer science 
 Per Martin-Löf. A theory of types. Preprint, Stockholm University, 1971.
 Per Martin-Löf. An intuitionistic theory of types. In G. Sambin and J. Smith, editors, Twenty-Five Years of Constructive Type Theory. Oxford University Press, 1998. Reprinted version of an unpublished report from 1972.
 Per Martin-Löf. An intuitionistic theory of types: Predicative part. In H. E. Rose and J. C. Shepherdson, editors, Logic Colloquium ‘73, pages 73–118. North Holland, 1975.
 Per Martin-Löf. Constructive mathematics and computer programming. In Logic, Methodology and Philosophy of Science VI, 1979. Eds. Cohen, et al. North-Holland, Amsterdam. pp. 153–175, 1982.
 Per Martin-Löf.  Intuitionistic type theory. (Notes by Giovanni Sambin of a series of lectures given in Padua, June 1980). Napoli, Bibliopolis, 1984.
 Per Martin-Löf. Philosophical implications of type theory, Unpublished notes, 1987?
 Per Martin-Löf. Substitution calculus, 1992. Notes from a lecture given in Göteborg.
 Bengt Nordström, Kent Petersson, and Jan M. Smith. Programming in Martin-Löf's Type Theory. Oxford University Press, 1990.  (The book is out of print, but a free version has been made available.)
 Per Martin-Löf. On the Meanings of the Logical Constants and the Justifications of the Logical Laws. Nordic Journal of Philosophical Logic, 1(1): 11–60, 1996.
 Per Martin-Löf. Logic and Ethics. In T. Piecha and P. Schroeder-Heister, editors, Proof-Theoretic Semantics: Assessment and Future Perspectives. Proceedings of the Third Tübingen Conference on Proof-Theoretic Semantics, 27–30 March 2019, pages 227-235. URI: http://dx.doi.org/10.15496/publikation-35319. University of Tübingen 2019.

External links

Members of the Royal Swedish Academy of Sciences
Members of Academia Europaea
Mathematical logicians
Swedish logicians

Swedish statisticians
20th-century Swedish philosophers
21st-century Swedish philosophers
Swedish information theorists
20th-century Swedish mathematicians
21st-century Swedish mathematicians
Academic staff of Stockholm University
Birdwatchers
Swedish ornithologists
1942 births
Living people
Tarski lecturers
Gödel Lecturers